Jesús López de Lara (born 22 March 1892, date of death unknown) was a Spanish Olympic fencer. He competed in the team épée and sabre events at the 1924 Summer Olympics.

References

External links
 

1892 births
Year of death missing
Spanish male épée fencers
Olympic fencers of Spain
Fencers at the 1924 Summer Olympics
Fencers from Madrid
Spanish male sabre fencers